Ilan Shor (or Șor; ; born 6 March 1987) is a jewish Moldovan businessman, oligarch and politician. From July 2015 to April 2019, he served as mayor of the Moldovan city of Orhei. He owns several Moldovan businesses, including a company named Dufremol (Duty-free) and the FC Milsami football club. In 2014, he became the chairman of the board of the Savings Bank of Moldova.

Personal life 
Shor was born in Tel Aviv, Israel on 6 March 1987, the son of Miron and Maria Shor, Moldovan Jews from Chișinău who had moved to Israel in the late 1970s. The family returned to Chișinău around 1990, when Shor was either two or three years old, and his father went into business in Moldova. His father died in 2005. Shor has been married to the Russian singer Jasmin since 2011. In addition to Jasmin's son from a previous marriage, they have a daughter, Margarita, who was born in 2012, and a son, Miron, who was born in 2016.

2014 Moldovan bank fraud scandal 
The Kroll report claims that although the final beneficiaries are unknown, some companies that Shor has links to benefited, either directly or indirectly, from loans issued from the three banks involved in the 2014 Moldovan bank fraud scandal. On 26 November 2014, the banks went bankrupt and were later placed under special administration of the National Bank of Moldova. On 27 November, the Moldovan Government, headed by Prime Minister Iurie Leancă, secretly decided to bail out the three banks with $870 million in emergency loans, covered from state reserves. This created a deficit in Moldovan public finances equivalent to an eighth of the country's GDP.

In the week preceding the 2014 Moldovan parliamentary elections, more than $750 million were extracted from the three banks between 24 and 26 November. A van belonging to Klassica Force, while transporting 12 sacks of bank files, was stolen and burned on November 27. Records of many transactions were deleted from the banks' computers.

In March 2015, Ilan Shor was suspected by the National Anti-Corruption Center (NAC) for his work in the Savings Bank. On 17 March 2015 he was questioned for 8 hours and anti-corruption officers seized his personal property. On May 6, 2015 Shor was placed under house arrest. As of 2015, Shor is allowed to move freely, after a period of house arrest. This is because he fully cooperated with the investigation. Despite this, he was allowed to register for electoral race for the mayor of city of Orhei, a contest in which he won 62% of the vote on June 14 local government election.

Political career

Mayor of Orhei 
On 14 June 2015, Shor was elected mayor of the Moldovan town of Orhei with 62% of the vote, a post he held until April 2019.

According to the polls made in 2019 related to the most popular politicians in Moldova, Shor was ranked at the third position among the top politicians in which Moldovans had the highest trust, and by some polls he was ranked at the sixth and at the seventh position accordingly.

Opposition figure

Shor is a pro-Moscow opposition figure in Moldovan politics who has been described as "a leading figure in the Kremlin’s efforts to subvert" the former Soviet republic of Moldova, according to intelligence reports. Shor is known by the moniker of "the young one" by Russia’s Federal Security Service (FSB), which, according to intercepted communications, sent Russian political strategists to assist Shor's political party.

On 26 October 2022, he was sanctioned by the United States Department of Treasury over his association with the Russian government.

References 

Living people
1987 births
People from Tel Aviv
Moldovan businesspeople
Moldovan Jews
Moldovan people of Israeli descent
Jewish Moldovan politicians
Jewish mayors
Specially Designated Nationals and Blocked Persons List
Federal Security Service officers
Israeli criminals
Moldovan criminals